Chuck Gray is an American politician and the secretary of state of Wyoming, having won the 2022 election unopposed. Gray was previously a member of the Wyoming House of Representatives representing the 57th District.

Career
Prior to his election to the Wyoming House of Representatives, Gray had a radio talk show on Casper radio station KVOC.

Wyoming House of Representatives
Gray challenged incumbent State Representative Thomas Lockhart in the Republican primary but was defeated, receiving only 48% of the vote to Lockhart's 52%.

When Lockhart announced his retirement, Gray again announced his candidacy for the seat in 2016. He defeated Ray Pacheco in the Republican primary with 59% of the vote and defeated Democrat Audrey Cotherman in the general election with 64% of the vote.

Gray ran for reelection in 2018. In the Republican primary he faced former Casper Mayor Daniel Sandoval, who defeated with 61% of the vote. Gray defeated Democrat Jane Ifland in the general election with 61% of the vote.

In 2020, Gray was unopposed in the Republican primary. He again faced Democrat Jane Ifland in the general election and defeated her with 69% of the vote.

Wyoming Secretary of State
In March 2021, Gray announced that he was running for the Republican nomination for Wyoming's at-large congressional district in the 2022 election, challenging incumbent Liz Cheney in a primary after Wyoming GOP censured Cheney for her vote to impeach Donald Trump. In September 2021, Donald Trump endorsed Harriet Hageman in the primary which led to Gray dropping out to consolidate the anti-Cheney vote around Hageman.

In March 2022, Gray announced he would run for Wyoming Secretary of State in 2022. He was endorsed by Donald Trump and he won the Republican primary.

Political positions 
Chuck Gray has been described by the Associated Press as "one of Wyoming's most Trump-like legislators". Gray is a supporter of the disproven conspiracy theory that the 2020 presidential election–in which Joe Biden lawfully defeated Trump–was "stolen". He has accused the media of refusing to cover evidence of electoral fraud, and attended the 2021 Maricopa County presidential ballot audit. Gray has advocated banning ballot drop boxes and instituting mandatory hand-counted election audits.

References

External links
Official page at the Wyoming Legislature
Profile from Ballotpedia

21st-century American politicians
Living people
Republican Party members of the Wyoming House of Representatives
Politicians from Casper, Wyoming
Secretaries of State of Wyoming
University of Pennsylvania alumni
Year of birth missing (living people)